Ferri Abolhassan (born 29 July 1964) is a German manager and editor of specialized literature on IT and management topics. Abolhassan is member of the managing board of Telekom Deutschland GmbH, where he is responsible for the service business area.

Vocational training and career
Abolhassan was born in Saarbrücken, Germany, into a German-Persian family. After earning his Abitur, he studied computer science at Saarland University in Saarbrücken from 1985 to 1988. He began his career in 1987 in research and development at Siemens in Munich, followed by a stint at IBM US in San Jose, California, from 1989 to 1991. He earned his doctorate under supervisor Wolfgang Paul in 1992.

SAP and IDS Scheer
In 1992, Abolhassan joined the software company SAP, where he worked in a variety of positions until 2001, initially as sales director retail and ultimately as senior vice president of the global retail solutions business unit. After serving four years on the executive board of IDS Scheer, as co-CEO and co-chairman responsible for sales, marketing and internationalization, Abolhassan returned to SAP in 2005. Here, he served as chief operating officer EMEA, then regional managing director South-West Europe, and finally executive vice president large enterprise EMEA.

Deutsche Telekom AG

T-Systems 
Abolhassan took over the newly created position of head of systems integration at T-Systems in September 2008, which also gave him a seat on the managing board. From the end of 2010, Abolhassan was also in charge of the production unit, until he took over the entire delivery unit in 2013. From January 2015, in his position as managing director, he headed the IT Division of T-Systems, where he was responsible for some 30,000 employees and around 4,000 customers. In addition, Abolhassan has also been responsible since January 2015 for establishing the new Telekom Security business area. This unit will consolidate all security departments within the Deutsche Telekom Group.

Telekom Deutschland 
In October 2016, he moved to Telekom Deutschland as managing director and took on the leadership of the new service transformation business area.
Since April 2017, Abolhassan has been chairman of the supervisory board at Vivento Customer Services (VCS) as well as managing director of Deutsche Telekom Kundenservice (DTKS) and Deutsche Telekom Technischer Service (DTTS). On 1 July 2017 he became chairman of the Board of the renamed companies Deutsche Telekom Service (DTS)and Deutsche Telekom Außendienst (DTA). He is responsible for the service business with some 33.000 employees. He also sits on the supervisory board of Deutsche Telekom IT.

Memberships and commitment 
Since August 2016, Abolhassan is a member of the Saarland state government's Council for Digitization (Digitalisierungsrat), which has been founded during a constitutive meeting in Saarbrücken's state chancellery on 29 August 2016. The advisory committee of Saarland's prime minister focuses on all challenges around digitization. Besides Abolhassan, it features further experts from different areas of expertise – overall the Council for Digitization has seven members:

 August-Wilhelm Scheer (Scheer Group)
 Wolfgang Wahlster (DFKI)
 Annette Kroeber-Riel (Google)
 Thomas Birr (RWE)
 Michael Hankel (ZF)
 Eva-Maria Welskop-Deffaa (ver.di)

Personal life
Abolhassan is married to Katja Wegmann. The native Saarlander is a passionate endurance athlete and has successfully completed 25 marathon runs and five Iron Man competitions. He also plays soccer and Tennis. Abolhassan volunteers as a "Saarland ambassador", to promote a positive image for the German state of Saarland.

Publications
 Abolhassan, Ferri (ed.): Cyber Security. Simply. Make it Happen. Leveraging Digitization Through IT Security, Springer Gabler (2016), eBook 
 Abolhassan, Ferri (ed.): The Drivers of Digital Transformation – Why There's No Way Around the Cloud, Springer Gabler (2016), eBook 
 Abolhassan, Ferri (ed.): The Road to a Modern IT Factory: Industrialization - Automation - Optimization, Springer Gabler (2014), eBook 
 Abolhassan, Ferri; Scheer; August-Wilhelm; Jost, Wolfram; Kirchmer, Mathias (ed.): Business Process Change Management: ARIS in Practice, Springer (2003),

References

External links
 T-Systems website

Living people
1964 births